Uropetala chiltoni (New Zealand mountain giant dragonfly) is a giant dragonfly in the family Petaluridae, endemic to New Zealand. The Māori name for giant dragonflies, kapokapowai, means "water snatcher", alluding to the water-dwelling juvenile stage (nymph), which, like all dragonflies, has a long extendable jaw that shoots out to snatch prey.

Description 
The second-largest New Zealand dragonfly species, Uropetala chiltoni has a body length of about 80 mm and wingspan of about 100 mm. Uropetala chiltoni can be distinguished from the similar Uropetala carovei by large pale blotches on its labrum (which in Uropetala carovei is all black), and its black femur leg segments (which are brownish in Uropetala carovei). It was described as a separate species in 1921, based on specimens collected at Cass and Arthur's Pass.

Distribution 
This species is found only in New Zealand, in upland and sub-alpine parts of the South Island. It has been recorded from Lake Rotoiti down to Lake Wakatipu and east to the Old Man Range and Garvie Mountains. There are also unconfirmed reports from the southern North Island.

Ecology 
The nymphs tunnel into the soft earth around alpine swamp or seepage in Schoenus tussock grassland. Even when forest cover is present the larvae prefer wetlands in forest clearings. They occupy a chamber half-filled with water for perhaps 5–6 years, emerging at night to seek prey near the burrow entrance. Tillyard observed that the larvae when dug out of their burrows are docile, not aggressive like those of U. carovei. Adults hunt around forest margins and swampland.

References

External links 
 Uropetala dragonflies discussed on RNZ Critter of the Week, 16 September 2016

Petaluridae
Odonata of New Zealand
Insects described in 1921